Acanthopagrus morrisoni, commonly known as the western yellowfin seabream, also known as the yellow sea bream or datina, is a porgy of the family Sparidae. It was recognised as a distinct species separate from  latus in 2013.

References

External links
 Fishes of Australia : Acanthopagrus morrisoni

western yellowfin seabream
Marine fish of Northern Australia
western yellowfin seabream